Abgarowicz is a Polish surname. Notable people with the surname include:

 Kajetan Abgarowicz (1856–1909), Polish journalist and writer
 Łukasz Abgarowicz (born 1949), Polish politician

See also
 Abgarowicz coat of arms

Polish-language surnames